Raphael “Ralph” Tracy (February 6, 1904 – March 6, 1975) was an American soccer player.  Tracy spent his club career with several teams in St. Louis, Missouri.  He also played in all three U.S. games at the 1930 FIFA World Cup.  He is a member of the National Soccer Hall of Fame.

Club career
Tracy was born and grew up in St. Louis, Missouri but spent some time in early years in Gillespie, Illinois playing soccer.  He began his club career as a forward with St. Louis Vesper Buick of the St. Louis Soccer League (SLSL) during the 1925 season.  While he was the second leading scorer on the team, he was released during the 1925–1926 season.  He then signed with Ben Millers and finished the season with them.  He moved to the midfield with the Ben Millers; playing on the team which lost the 1926 National Challenge Cup to Bethlehem Steel.  He scored six goals during the 1931–1932 season, tying for sixth in the league.

National team
Tracy earned three caps with the U.S. national team at the 1930 FIFA World Cup.  While the U.S. won the first two games, over Belgium and Paraguay by a 3–0 score in each game, they lost to Argentina 6–1 in the semifinals.  Tracy broke his leg ten minutes into the game.  He continued to play until half time.

Tracy was inducted into the St. Louis Soccer Hall of Fame in 1973 and the National Soccer Hall of Fame in 1986.

Notes

References

External links
 National Soccer Hall of Fame profile
 1930 World Cup team photo

1904 births
1930 FIFA World Cup players
1975 deaths
American soccer players
Soccer players from St. Louis
Soccer players from Illinois
United States men's international soccer players
St. Louis Soccer League players
St. Louis Vesper Buick players
St. Louis Ben Millers players
National Soccer Hall of Fame members
Association football forwards